Elias Atkinson Bonine (1843-1916) was an American photographer. Bonine was known for his portraits of 19th century Native Americans. 

Born in Lancaster, Pennsylvania in 1843, he died in Pasadena, California in  1916.Bonine had two brothers who were both photographers.

Bonine was a prolific photographer of the indigenous peoples of North America, who he often staged in his photographs. His work differed from that of anthropologists and government survey photographers, as his intended audience was the general public. 

His work is included in the collections of the Smithsonian American Art Museum, the Getty Museum, and the Museum of Fine Arts, Houston.

References

1843 births
1916 deaths
19th-century American artists
20th-century American artists
19th-century American photographers
20th-century American photographers
Artists from Lancaster, Pennsylvania